Lionel Rouwen Aingimea (born 2 September 1965) is a Nauruan lawyer and politician. He served as the fifteenth president of Nauru from 2019 to 2022. He currently serves as Deputy Speaker of the Parliament of Nauru.

Early life
Aingimea was born in September 1965 into the Deiboe tribe. He studied law in Australia and subsequently worked for the Regional Rights Resource Team NGO, and as a public defender in the Marshall Islands. He later worked as a lecturer in law at the University of the South Pacific.

Political career
Aingimea ran for election to Parliament in the Meneng Constituency in 2013, but failed to be elected. Following the elections, he joined the new administration of President Baron Waqa as Secretary for Justice.

After successfully contesting the Meneng seat in the 2016 elections, he was appointed Assistant Minister for Justice and Border Control in Waqa's government, serving under Minister for Justice David Adeang. He was re-elected in the 2019 elections, which saw Waqa lose his seat. Following the elections, he was elected President by Parliament, defeating Adeang by twelve votes to six.

After Russ Kun's election as president, on 28 September 2022, Aingimea began serving as Deputy Speaker under Speaker Marcus Stephen.

References 

Members of the Parliament of Nauru
Presidents of Nauru
Nauruan lawyers
Nauruan educators
Academic staff of the University of the South Pacific
Nauruan civil servants
Living people
1965 births
21st-century Nauruan politicians